Silvio Ernesto Avilés Ramos (born 11 August 1980) is a Nicaraguan footballer who currently plays for Managua in the Primera División de Nicaragua.

Club career
A leftback, Avilés started his career at Diriangén and also played for Walter Ferretti from 2008, before joining Managua in January 2012.

International career
Avilés made his debut for Nicaragua in a February 2003 UNCAF Nations Cup match against El Salvador and has, as of December 2013, earned a total of 22 caps, scoring no goals. He has represented his country in 2 FIFA World Cup qualification matches and played at the 2003, 2005, 2007, and 2009 UNCAF Nations Cups as well as at the 2009 CONCACAF Gold Cup.

His final international was a September 2010 friendly match against Guatemala.

References

External links
 

1980 births
Living people
People from Carazo Department
Association football defenders
Nicaraguan men's footballers
Nicaragua international footballers
2003 UNCAF Nations Cup players
2005 UNCAF Nations Cup players
2007 UNCAF Nations Cup players
2009 UNCAF Nations Cup players
2009 CONCACAF Gold Cup players
Diriangén FC players
C.D. Walter Ferretti players
Managua F.C. players